The Antioquia class of destroyers consisted of two ships,  and  , used by the navy of Colombia, the Armada Nacional República de Colombia, between 1934 and 1961. Initially constructed at the Lisbon Naval Arsenal as part of the Portuguese Navy's , they were acquired by Colombia before completion in response to the Peruvian purchase of two destroyers during the war with Peru. They arrived too late to see service in the conflict and saw little action during their service lives. They underwent a major refit in the mid-1950s which saw their armament completely redone.  Following their removal from service in 1961, they were broken up for scrap.

Design and description
The Antioquia class was initially a version of the Portuguese Navy's . The design was by the British company Yarrow Shipbuilders, based on that of the Royal Navy's prototype destroyer . The Antioquia-class destroyers were acquired by Colombia before completion but were built to standard Douro-class specifics. The Douro class closely resembled many British designs in the interwar period.

The vessels were powered by three oil-fired Yarrow boilers providing  of steam to two Parsons turbines with Curtiss reduction gearing.

The Antioquia class was armed with four BL  guns with two mounted forward in single turrets with gun shields and two mounted aft in a similar fashion. 140 rounds were carried for each gun. The destroyers were equipped with three single-mounted  "pom-poms" with two on the aft shelter deck and one between the funnels. They were also armed with two quadruple banks of  torpedo tubes mounted centrally, two depth charge throwers with twelve depth charges and were fitted for minelaying with 20 naval mines carried.

Ships in class

Construction and service history
Originally ordered by the Portuguese government in 1930 as part of a new building programme. In conjunction with Yarrows, the Lisbon Naval Arsenal of Lisbon was chosen to construct two hulls while Yarrows would provide and install the destroyer's machinery. Named Douro and Tejo, the two hulls constructed in Lisbon were sold to Colombia before completion in response to the Colombia–Peru War, in response to the Peruvian acquisition of two destroyers. Portugal order two further ships to replace them. Douro was renamed Caldas and Tejo was renamed Antioquia.

The war with Peru was shortlived and the Antioquias did not enter service before the war ended. Both ships were launched in 1933 and were commissioned in 1934. The two destroyers saw little action as Colombia remained neutral during World War II. However, the Colombian Navy did perform neutrality patrols into the Caribbean Sea after the  began attacking shipping off its shores. Caldas patrolled the Caribbean Sea on 29–30 March 1944 searching for the submarine. In the 1940s, two  cannon were added amidships.

Following the war, the destroyers returned to their tranquil service until 1952 when Antioquia began a major refit, beginning at Cartagena before going to the United States in 1953. Caldas underwent the same refit in 1954–1955. Both ships were refitted in the United States when two /38 calibre guns replaced the four 4.7-inch guns, one forward and one aft. The destroyers were fitted with Mk 52 fire control, three more 40 mm guns and a hedgehog anti-submarine mortar. The number of torpedo tubes was reduced to one quadruple mount. Antioquia was decommissioned on 23 January 1961, and Caldas on 3 March 1961, with both ships being scrapped.

Notes

Citations

Sources
 
 
 

Destroyer classes
Military history of Colombia
Destroyers of the Colombian Navy
 
Colombia–Portugal relations